Daniel Lawrence Braine (May 18, 1829 – January 30, 1898) was an admiral of the United States Navy.

Early life
Born in New York City on May 18, 1829, Braine was appointed midshipman in 1846.

Civil War service
He also took part in the attack and capture of Fort Hatteras and Fort Clarke and engaged the enemy at Kimmekerk Woods above Cape Hatteras. He was promoted to lieutenant commander in July 1862.

Post-Civil War
Braine was promoted to commander in July 1866.

On November 1, 1871, he was elected as a Companion of the New York Commandery of the Military Order of the Loyal Legion of the United States – a military society of officers who had served the Union during the American Civil War. He was assigned insignia number 1338.

During this cruise, he was promoted to the rank of captain in 1874. In 1875, he took command of the receiving ship USS Colorado, after which he was assigned to command USS Powhatan. As a senior captain, Braine was permitted to use the customary title commodore beginning in 1885, and in late 1886 he was assigned to command the South Atlantic Squadron with promotion to rear admiral the following year. In 1889 he was assigned to command of the Brooklyn Navy Yard, where he served until his retirement.

Retirement and death
Rear Admiral Braine retired from the Navy in May 1891.

In 1895 he became a Veteran Companion of the New York Commandery of the Military Order of Foreign Wars and received insignia number 45.

He died in Brooklyn on January 30, 1898.

Namesake
The destroyer , (1943–1971) was named in his honor.

Dates of rank
 Midshipman, May 30, 1846.
 Passed Midshipman, June 8, 1852.
 Master, September 15, 1855.
 Lieutenant, September 16, 1855.
 Lieutenant Commander, July 16, 1862.
 Commander, July 25, 1866.
 Captain, December 11, 1874.
 Commodore, March 2, 1885.
 Rear Admiral, September 4, 1887.
 Retired List, May 18, 1891.

See also

References
 

1829 births
1898 deaths
United States Navy rear admirals (upper half)
Union Navy officers
People of New York (state) in the American Civil War
United States Navy personnel of the Mexican–American War
Burials at Green-Wood Cemetery